Lloyds Bank Corporate Markets is the investment banking arm of Lloyds Banking Group. LBCM has two primary investment banking functions: Capital Markets - under which Debt Capital Markets, private side derivatives, and Securitised Products sit - and Financial Markets - the interest rates, currency, inflation and gilts, flow sales and trading business. 

LBCM was created in 2017, to comply with the Financial Services (Banking Reform) Act 2013. The Act implements the Independent Commission on Banking recommendation that essential banking services are separated from investment banking activities by 2019.

Operations
The non ring-fenced entity also incorporates the business undertaken by Lloyds Bank International and the Group’s branches in the United States, Singapore and the Crown Dependencies.

The company was authorised with restrictions in 2017 and is currently registered as a Credit Institution with the Financial Conduct Authority and Prudential Regulatory Authority. Until the restrictions are removed, it is limited in its ability to undertake or have migrated to it any regulated financial services activities. In 2018, it was reported that traders will be physically separated from their colleagues and placed in a "glass box" to comply with rules.

Fitch Ratings has assigned Lloyds Bank Corporate Markets and Lloyds Bank International expected Long-Term Issuer Default Ratings of 'A(EXP)'.

See also

Lloyds Associated Banking Company
Lloyds Bank International
Hill Samuel

References

Lloyds Banking Group
Banks established in 2017
Banks of the United Kingdom